Saint-Georges-sur-Baulche is a commune in the Yonne department in Bourgogne-Franche-Comté in north-central France. It is twinned with the affluent English village of Little Aston.

See also
Communes of the Yonne department

References

Communes of Yonne